Nepali Kalyan High School is a co-educational school Siliguri, West Bengal, India. It was founded in 1983 and is managed by the Department of Higher Education.

Schools in Darjeeling district

See also
Education in India
List of schools in India
Education in West Bengal

References

External links

High schools and secondary schools in West Bengal
Education in Siliguri
Educational institutions established in 1983
1983 establishments in West Bengal

Schools in Darjeeling district